Victor A. Zucco (born September 4, 1935) is a former professional American football defensive back in the National Football League. He played four seasons for the Chicago Bears.

1935 births
Living people
American football defensive backs
Chicago Bears players
Wayne State Warriors football players
People from Allegheny County, Pennsylvania
Players of American football from Pennsylvania